Randolph Barnes Marcy (April 9, 1812 – November 22, 1887) was an officer in the United States Army, chiefly noted for his frontier guidebook, the Prairie Traveler (1859), based on his own extensive experience of pioneering in the west. This publication became a key handbook for the thousands of Americans wanting to cross the continent. In the Civil War, Marcy became chief of staff to his son-in-law George B. McClellan, and was later appointed Inspector General of the U.S. Army.

Biography

Marcy was born in Greenwich, Massachusetts and graduated from the United States Military Academy at West Point in 1832 as a lieutenant in the 5th U. S. Infantry. He married soon afterwards, and one of his children, Ellen Mary, would later marry future General-in-Chief George B. McClellan.

Marcy first saw combat while serving in the Black Hawk War in Illinois and Wisconsin. He was promoted Captain in the Mexican War, and fought at Palo Alto and Resaca de la Palma. He was then assigned to duty in Texas and Oklahoma, where he escorted emigrants, located military posts, explored the wilderness, and mapped routes. In 1852 he was in charge of the expedition that first reached the headwaters of both forks of the Red River. (It was on this expedition that he met McClellan.)

In 1857, Marcy accompanied Brigadier General Albert Sidney Johnston on the expedition against the Mormons in Utah. Here he distinguished himself on a forced march through the Rockies in midwinter, when he led his troops to safety after they had run out of provisions for two weeks. Meanwhile, his achievements and well-written military reports had attracted attention in Washington, and he was recalled to work for the Department of State. Here he prepared his acclaimed guidebook to the western trails, The Prairie Traveler: A Handbook for Overland Expeditions, with Maps, Illustrations, and Itineraries of the Principal Routes between the Mississippi and the Pacific.

Published by the U.S. Government in 1859, the Prairie Traveler quickly became an indispensable guide for the thousands of Americans wanting to reach California, Oregon, Utah, and other destinations.

Based on his own extensive experience of "more than thirty years of service in the United States Army, a large portion of the time on the frontiers" and in the mountains, deserts, and prairies, the book provided authoritative advice about reconnaissance, fieldcraft, provisions and healthcare, that would save many lives on these perilous routes. It covered key topics like hunting and tracking, and food and water supply, as well as specialist advice about the selection of horses, the avoiding of quicksands, the interpreting of smoke signals and sign language, and numerous other issues. It was a best-selling book for the remainder of the century. Andrew J. Birtle, author of U.S. Army Counterinsurgency and Contingency Operations Doctrine 1860-1941, has described the Prairie Traveler as "perhaps the single most important work on the conduct of frontier expeditions published under the aegis of the War Department."

After completing this work, Marcy was promoted to the rank of major and posted to the Pacific Northwest, where he was assigned as paymaster. At the start of the Civil War, he returned East and served as chief of staff to McClellan, by now his son-in-law. By the end of the war, he was Inspector-General of the U. S. Army. Marcy was brevetted major general of volunteers in 1868 (back-dated to 1865) and became a brigadier general of the U.S. Army in 1878. He continued his service until he retired in 1881.

Legacy
Fort Marcy Park in McLean, Virginia, was named for General Marcy.

A species of garter snake, Thamnophis marcianus, is named in his honor.

Texas Historical Commission Sites
During the twentieth century, United States Army Randolph Barnes Marcy received numerous historical markers by the Texas Historical Commission recognizing the Marcy Trail prairie routes through Indian Territory and Texas while establishing the Fort Smith - Santa Fe Trail of 1849.

See also

References

External links
 Handbook of Texas Online, MARCY, RANDOLPH BARNES
 
 
 
 Text of Marcy's Prairie Traveler
 Exploration of the Red River of Louisiana, in the year 1852 / by Randolph B. Marcy ; assisted by George B. McClellan. hosted by the Portal to Texas History
 

1812 births
1887 deaths
Union Army generals
People of Massachusetts in the American Civil War
People of Texas in the American Civil War
United States Military Academy alumni
Inspectors General of the United States Army
American botanists
American military personnel of the Mexican–American War
American people of the Black Hawk War
People from Greenwich, Massachusetts
People of the Utah War
Red River of the South